Ningxia Television or NXTV is a television station located in Ningxia, China. It began broadcasting on October 1, 1970.

Channels
Ningxia Television 1 (Economic Channel)
Ningxia Satellite Channel
Ningxia Television 3 (Public Channel)
Ningxia Television 4 (Movie & Programming Channel)
Ningxia Television 5 (Children's Channel)
Ningxia Television 6 (Home Shopping Channel)

See also
List of Chinese-language television channels
Television in the People's Republic of China

References
Ningxia Television - chinaculture.org

External links
 Official Website  

Television networks in China
Television channels and stations established in 1970
1970 establishments in China
Culture in Ningxia
Yinchuan